This is a list of political parties in the Czech Republic.  The Czech Republic has a multi-party system. Due to the electoral system used, a limited number of parties are successful in each parliamentary election.

Parliamentary parties

There are currently seven parties in the Chamber of Deputies –  ANO 2011, the Civic Democratic Party (ODS), Mayors and Independents (STAN), the Christian and Democratic Union – Czechoslovak People's Party (KDU-ČSL), Freedom and Direct Democracy (SPD), TOP 09 and the Czech Pirate Party (Pirates). All of these parties except the SPD also have at least one seat in the Senate. Since the 2022 Czech Senate election, Senator 21 (SEN 21) have had four seats in the Senate, Mayors for the Liberec Region (SLK) have two Senate seats, and Svobodní have one Senate seat. None of these three parties have any seats in the Chamber of Deputies or the European Parliament. The Communist Party of Bohemia and Moravia (KSČM) hold no seats in the Chamber or the Senate but do have one elected member of the European Parliament and have elected representatives at the regional level.

The only party to have had members elected to every Parliament since the dissolution of Czechoslovakia is ODS.

The next legislative election will be held no later than 2025.

Note: The sum of the total seats held by each party may not amount to the total seats as a whole in the Chamber, Senate, Regions, and/or European Parliament because of independent politicians (i.e. those not members of any political party) holding the remaining seats.

Non-parliamentary parties
Agrarian Democratic Party (Agrární demokratická strana)
Alliance for the Future (Aliance pro budoucnost)
Alliance of National Forces (Aliance národních sil)
Citizens of the Czech Republic (Občané české republiky)
Civic Conservative Party (Občanská konzervativní strana)
Civic Democratic Alliance (Občanská demokratická aliance)
Club of Committed Non-Party Members (Klub angažovaných nestraníků)
Conservative Party (Konzervativní strana)
Czech National Social Party (Česká strana národně sociální)
Democratic Party of Greens (Demokratická strana zelených)
Free Bloc (Volný blok)
Freeholder Party of the Czech Republic (Strana soukromníků České republiky)
Green Party (Strana zelených)
The Czech Crown (Monarchist Party of Bohemia, Moravia and Silesia) (Koruna Česká (monarchistická strana Čech, Moravy a Slezska))
Liberal-Environmental Party (Liberálně-ekologická strana)
Masaryk Democratic Party (Masarykova demokratická strana)
The Moravians (Moravané)
National Democracy (Národní demokracie)
Party for the Open Society (Strana pro otevřenou společnost)
Party of Common Sense (Strana zdravého rozumu)
Party of Civic Rights (Strana práv občanů)
Přísaha
Rally for the Republic – Republican Party of Czechoslovakia (Sdružení pro republiku – Republikánská strana Československa)
Right Bloc (Volte Pravý Blok)
Severočeši.cz, cross-spectrum regional party from northern Bohemia.
SNK European Democrats (SNK Evropští demokraté)
Socialist Alternative Future (Socialistická alternativa Budoucnost)
Svobodní
Swiss Democracy (Švýcarská demokracie)
The Left (Levice)
Tricolour Citizens' Movement (Trikolóra hnutí občanů)
Urza.cz (Nevolte Urza.cz)
Voice (Hlas)
Volt Czech Republic (Volt)
Workers' Party of Social Justice (Dělnická strana sociální spravedlnosti)

Defunct parties
Association of Radicals for the United States of Europe (Asociace radikálů za Spojené státy evropské)
Freedom Union – Democratic Union (Unie svobody – Demokratická unie)
Christian Democratic Party (Křesťanskodemokratická strana)
Civic Movement (Občanské hnutí)
Civic Democratic Alliance (Občanská demokratická aliance)
Czech National Socialist Party (Česká strana národně socialistická)
Dawn – National Coalition (Úsvit-Národní koalice)
Democratic Union (Demokratická unie)
European Democratic Party (Evropská demokratická strana)
Friends of Beer Party (Strana přátel piva)
Head Up – Electoral Bloc (Hlavu vzhůru – volební blok)
Independence Party of the Czech Republic (Strana nezávislosti České republiky)
Independent Democrats (Nezávislí demokraté)
Left Bloc (Levý blok)
Liberal Social Union (Liberálně sociální unie)
Liberal Reform Party (Liberální reformní strana)
Movement for Autonomous Democracy–Party for Moravia and Silesia (Hnutí za samosprávnou demokracii – Společnost pro Moravu a Slezsko)
National Party (Národní strana)
National Socialists (Národní socialisté)
Public Affairs (Věci veřejné)
Party of the Democratic Left (Strana demokratické levice)
Party of Conservative Accord (Strana konzervativní smlouvy)
Path of Change (Cesta změny)
Party for Life Security (Strana za životní jistoty)
Realists (Realisté)
Workers' Party (Dělnická strana)

See also

Lists of political parties
List of political parties in Czechoslovakia
Liberalism in the Czech lands

References

External links
List of political parties registered by Ministry of Interior in Czech Republic (in Czech)

Czech Republic
 
Political parties
Czech Republic
Political parties